MyNetworkTV (unofficially abbreviated MyTV, MyNet, MNT or MNTV, and sometimes referred to as My Network) is an American commercial broadcast television syndication service and former television network owned by Fox Corporation, operated by its Fox Television Stations division, and distributed through the syndication structure of Fox First Run. MyNetworkTV began its operations on September 5, 2006, with an initial affiliate lineup covering about 96% of the country, most of which consisted of stations that were former affiliates of The WB and UPN that did not join the successor of those two networks, The CW. Under the ownership structure of Fox Corporation, the service is incorporated as a subsidiary company known as MyNetworkTV, Inc.

On September 28, 2009, following disappointment with the network's results, MyNetworkTV dropped its status as a television network and transitioned into a programming service, similar to Ion Television and The CW Plus, relying mainly on repeats of recent broadcast and cable series.

Fox Corporation retained MyNetworkTV after the acquisition of 21st Century Fox by The Walt Disney Company was completed on March 20, 2019.

Origins

MyNetworkTV arose from the January 2006 announcement of the launch of The CW, a television network formed by CBS Corporation and Time Warner which essentially combined programming from The WB and UPN onto the scheduling model of the former of the two predecessors. As a result of several deals earlier in the decade, Fox Television Stations owned several UPN affiliates, including the network's three largest stations: WWOR-TV in Secaucus, New Jersey (part of the New York City market), KCOP-TV in Los Angeles and WPWR-TV in Chicago. Fox had acquired WWOR and KCOP after purchasing most of the television holdings of UPN's founding partner Chris-Craft Industries, while WPWR was purchased by the company in 2003 from Newsweb Corporation. Despite concerns about UPN's future that came up after Fox purchased the Chris-Craft stations, UPN signed three-year affiliation renewals with the network's Fox-owned affiliates in 2003. That agreement's pending expiration, along with those involving other broadcasting companies, in 2006 as well as persistent financial losses for both it and The WB gave CBS Corporation (the parent company of UPN) and Time Warner (parent of The WB) the rare opportunity to merge their respective struggling networks into The CW.

The CW's initial affiliation agreements did not include any of the UPN stations (nor a lone independent station) owned by Fox Television Stations. In fact, as part of a ten-year affiliation deal with The WB's part-owner, Tribune Broadcasting, the coveted New York City, Los Angeles and Chicago affiliations all went to Tribune-owned stations (WPIX, KTLA and WGN-TV, respectively). In response to the announcement, Fox promptly removed all network references from logos and promotional materials on its UPN affiliates and ceased on-air promotion of UPN's programs altogether. However, in all three cases (especially in the cases of Los Angeles and Chicago), the WB affiliate was the higher-rated station; CW executives were on record as preferring the "strongest" WB and UPN affiliates.

Media reports speculated that the Fox-owned UPN affiliates would all revert to being independent stations, or else form another network by uniting with other UPN and WB affiliated stations that were left out of The CW's affiliation deals. Fox chose the latter route and announced the launch of MyNetworkTV on February 22, 2006, less than a month after CBS and Time Warner announced the formation of The CW on January 24. It was reported by The Guardian that Fox would utilize MySpace, the social networking website; its parent company, News Corporation, had acquired in 2005, to help promote MyNetworkTV. Fox would also utilize MySpace's content-sharing model when it launched MyNetworkTV's website. There were also rumors that MyNetworkTV's branding was inspired by that of MySpace's.

Programming

MyNetworkTV began operations on Tuesday, September 5, 2006, with the premieres of its two initial series. Some affiliates unofficially began branding their stations well beforehand in July into August to allow viewers to grow accustomed to their new brandings, though most fulfilled their existing WB and UPN network commitments and did not start branding in earnest until September 1 (the Friday before), when the majority of those affiliate agreements expired. The network provided a block of preview programming that aired the day before on September 4, though it did not launch officially that day due to the low audience figures traditionally associated with the Labor Day holiday.

Initially, programming aired Monday through Saturdays from 8:00 to 10:00 p.m. (Eastern and Pacific Time). As of April 2013, MyNetworkTV broadcasts ten hours of primetime programming each week, airing on Monday through Friday evenings from 8:00 to 10:00 p.m. Eastern and Pacific. MyNetworkTV does not air programming on weekends, the only broadcast service not to in the United States.

Heavy local sports preemptions were previously a problem for MyNetworkTV at its launch, as they were for all of the U.S. broadcast networks that have debuted since the January 1995 launches of The WB and UPN. However, these have become less of an issue with the end of the network's telenovela strategy, where an airing of the pre-empted telenovela episode rescheduled as soon as possible on the same day as required by default rather than the flexibility that affiliates of UPN, The WB or The CW had to push a show off to a weekend slot. With the service's switch to an all-rerun schedule in 2009, this effectively allows stations to pre-empt repeat programming at will to fit in sporting events (mainly those provided by syndication services such as ESPN Regional Television and the ACC Network, as some local events that had aired on its affiliates have moved to regional sports networks in the time since MyNetworkTV launched) without much consequence. During the telenovela era, affiliates often scheduled contractual "make goods" of the network's daily schedule between 3:00 and 6:00 a.m. local time. Not only are these light viewing hours, but they air after Nielsen processes its preliminary morning network ratings.

Telenovelas

The network's original format focused on the 18-to-49-year-old, English-speaking population with programming consisting exclusively of telenovelas (a version of the soap opera format rarely attempted on American television outside of Spanish language broadcast networks, much less in primetime), starting with Desire and Fashion House. Originally, each series aired Monday through Friday in continuous cycles of 13-week seasons, with a one-hour recap of the week's episodes airing on Saturdays; when one series ended, another unrelated series would begin the following week. The fifth and sixth series, American Heiress and Saints and Sinners, appeared one hour per week on Wednesdays before abruptly vanishing from the schedule. The MyNetworkTV serial lineup was broadcast in Australia on the W. Channel under the block name FOXTELENOVELA. In Canada, the first Desire/Fashion House cycle aired weekday afternoons on Toronto independent station CKXT-TV, which decided not to air subsequent cycles for unknown reasons.

Proposed programming
The announcement of the network also stated that additional unscripted reality-based and current-affairs programming were in development. These included:
 Catwalk, a series similar to America's Next Top Model
 On Scene, a crime-based news magazine produced by Fox News
 An American version of the quiz show Britain's Brainiest
 An American version of the ITV series Love Island, which would later be picked up by CBS

MyNetworkTV abandoned the development of these programs in mid-2006, choosing to focus solely on telenovelas.

Later announcements by Fox regarding additional programming to air on MyNetworkTV owned-and-operated stations – such as Desperate Housewives repeats in traditional weekend syndication, a trial run of the sitcom Tyler Perry's House of Payne (which later moved to TBS), and the daytime viewer-participation game show My GamesFever – never applied to the network as a whole.

Other programming
MyNetworkTV does not supply any children's programming, late-night programming or any news or sports programming. San Francisco affiliate KRON-TV (which has maintained a news department since it launched as an NBC affiliate in 1949), Philadelphia affiliate WPHL-TV (which produces a morning newscast, while its 10:00pm newscast is produced by ABC O&O WPVI-TV), and Escanaba affiliate WJMN-TV (which started its news operation as a CBS affiliate) are currently the only stations aligned with the service that produce their own local news programming, giving MyNetworkTV the fewest news-producing stations among the six major broadcast networks (in comparison, The CW has four news-producing stations within its portfolio).

Some Fox stations that declined to carry 4Kids TV passed on that block to an affiliate of UPN/The CW or The WB/MyNetworkTV, or an independent station, in order for the Fox affiliate to air general entertainment programming or local newscasts on Saturday mornings (for example, WFLD in Chicago moved the 4Kids TV schedule to co-owned then-UPN affiliate WPWR-TV, while WFLD aired infomercials).

Some MyNetworkTV affiliates began carrying the Litton-owned E/I Go Time block since October 1, 2016. It would mainly be carried by CBS Television Stations, along with Gray Television and Sinclair Broadcast Group to carry the block. Other groups carrying it are Cox, Hearst, NPG, Scripps, and Weigel.

Some MyNetworkTV affiliates began carrying the Steve Rotfeld Productions-owned E/I Xploration Station block since September 13, 2014. It would mainly be carried by Fox Television Stations, along with Nexstar Media Group to carry the block.  Other groups carrying it are Gray Television and Sinclair Broadcast Group.

Many of the service's other affiliates carry local newscasts produced through a news share agreement with a station affiliated with one of the major networks (most often, these are produced by those owned or managed alongside the local MyNetworkTV-affiliate station), and may serve as broadcasters for local sports teams. They may also air Big Four network programming as an alternate outlet due to either breaking news or major sporting events.

Revamping the schedule
In response to the telenovela lineup's poor ratings performance, highlighted by an average household rating of 0.7%, reports surfaced that Fox executives were planning a major revamp of MyNetworkTV's programming, decreasing its reliance on telenovelas and adding new unscripted programs to the schedule such as reality shows, game shows (such as My GamesFever), movies and sports, and a possible revisit to a deal with the Ultimate Fighting Championship. However, MyNetworkTV instead signed a deal with another mixed martial arts organization, the International Fight League, in conjunction with Fox Sports Net.

On February 1, 2007, Greg Meidel, who was named to the newly created position of network president just ten days earlier, confirmed the rumors and unveiled a dramatically revamped lineup. The intent of the shakeup was to increase viewer awareness of the network (and boost viewership, in turn), as well as to satisfy local affiliates who were disappointed over the poor ratings performance of the network under its initial format. After March 7 (when Wicked Wicked Games and Watch Over Me finished their runs), telenovelas were reduced to occupying only two nights of its programming schedule, airing in two-hour movie-style blocks rather than each of the serials airing in a one-hour, five-night-a-week format. The remainder of the schedule included theatrical movies and the new IFL Battleground (originally titled Total Impact). In addition, the Saturday night telenovela recaps ended immediately, with movies running on that night until March. The 1986 film Something Wild aired on February 3, becoming the network's first non-telenovela presentation.

Specials (ranging from the World Music Awards to the Hawaiian Tropic International Beauty Pageant) and reality programming were also a part of the network's reformatting, with the first two specials airing on March 7. MyNetworkTV also reduced its telenovela programming to a single night each week, with American Heiress and Saints & Sinners airing for one hour each on Wednesdays until their unexpected termination, due to incompatible flow with IFC Battleground from Monday to Tuesday as far as promotions. The new Thursday night movie block featured mostly action/adventure films, with Friday night featuring a mix of contemporary classic films, beginning on June 5.

A side effect of the new programming schedule was the loss of the network's claim that it was the only U.S. broadcast network at the time to have its entire programming schedule available in high definition, due to the IFL, some of the network's movies and additional programs being produced exclusively in 480i standard definition. In the fall of 2007, MyNetworkTV dropped telenovelas altogether, and began to air reality series and sports programs.

On September 1, 2007, the network aired its first live program, the men's final of the AVP Croc Tour's Cincinnati Open. The network debuted its first sitcom, the Flavor Flav vehicle Under One Roof, on April 16, 2008; because the series used Canadian writers, it was unaffected by the 2007–08 Writers Guild strike.

On February 26, 2008, the network announced it had picked up the rights to air WWE SmackDown, which left The CW at the end of September 2008. The first SmackDown episode on MyNetworkTV aired on October 3, 2008. The first episode of WWE SmackDown pulled in the largest audience in MyNetworkTV history with 3.2 million viewers, and for the first time, put the network in fifth place for the night – ahead of The CW – and was the top-rated program that night in the male 18-34 and 18-49 demographics.

Out-of-pattern scheduling

Depending on the market, many current and former affiliate stations have presented MyNetworkTV programs out of pattern – either to run syndicated programs or local newscasts or because of an existing affiliation with another network:
 Network flagship WWOR-TV in Secaucus, New Jersey (New York City market) in the 2013–14 season, aired a two-hour block of reruns of The Simpsons on Thursday nights from 8 to 10pm (at that time, the station was already airing regularly scheduled reruns of the show weeknights from 6:30pm to 7:30pm; reruns currently air in the market in late nights on co-owned Fox O&O WNYW); a dual airing of House reruns, which was scheduled by the network at 8-10 PM on Thursday nights at that time, was instead run by WWOR on Saturday nights in the same timeframe. (Incidentally, Fox aired first-run Simpsons episodes on Thursday nights at 8pm for a period in the early '90s.)
 KCOP-TV in Los Angeles, the network's West Coast flagship, moved MyNetworkTV's block to 11:00pm to 1:00am weeknights as of September 14, 2015, replacing the primetime hours with two hours of entertainment newsmagazine programming, including TMZ Live and Hollywood Today Live, by far the most high-profile move of the network out of primetime.
 WPWR-TV in Gary, Indiana/Chicago moved MyNetworkTV to 9:00-11:00 p.m. timeslot on September 1, 2016, and became the CW affiliate for Chicago, replacing WGN-TV. The network continues to air in the timeslot since losing the network to WCIU-TV.
 From MyNetworkTV's launch through August 18, 2017, KRON-TV—San Francisco aired MyNetworkTV programming on an hour delay from 9:00 to 11:00 p.m. (Pacific Time), which is bookended by local evening newscasts (an hour-long newscast at 8:00, and a half-hour 11:00pm newscast carried over from its former NBC affiliation). KRON-TV moved the network's programming to late-night when it launched an hour-long newscast at 10:00 p.m. on May 16, 2016, and another newscast at 9:00 p.m. on August 21, 2017, respectively.
 KZJO in Seattle, Washington airs MyNetworkTV programs from 1:00 to 3:00am, with syndicated reruns airing during the 8:00 p.m. (Pacific Time) hour and a newscast produced by Fox-owned sister station KCPQ airing at 9:00pm. The MyNetworkTV block is so played down on the station's schedule that their website erroneously notes it ended the affiliation in 2011 when it rebranded to "JoeTV" as part of then-station owner Tribune Media's attempts to brand stations more locally rather than by their network affiliations. In 2021, a year after Fox purchased it, the station was rebranded again as "Fox 13+".
 KAYU-TV in Spokane, Washington has MyNetworkTV on 28.2. The station airs its programming 5:00pm to 7:00pm (Pacific Time) while the remainder of the schedule is filled by programming from Antenna TV.
 KPDX in Portland, Oregon airs MyNetworkTV programs from 10:00pm to 12:00am, due to a two-hour-long 8:00pm (Pacific Time) newscast produced by Fox-affiliated sister station KPTV (which debuted on September 8, 2008, as a one-hour program, before expanding to its current two-hour format on August 25, 2014).
 From MyNetworkTV's launch through September 19, 2009, KQCA—Sacramento, California aired MyNetworkTV programming one hour earlier (7:00 to 9:00pm) than most other Pacific Time Zone affiliates since it aired repeats of The Oprah Winfrey Show at 9:00pm as a lead-in to the station's 10:00 p.m. newscast that is produced by NBC-affiliated sister station KCRA-TV. KQCA then presented MyNetworkTV programming in a pattern, with the 7:00pm hour being filled by syndicated reruns until the 2014–15 television season. At that point, KQCA started filling the 8:00 to 10:00pm block with syndicated comedies, extending their "Come Home to Comedy" block from 5:00 to 10:00pm. KQCA airs MyNetworkTV programming in late night from 12:00 to 2:00 a.m.
 During its time as a MyNetworkTV affiliate, KJZZ-TV—Salt Lake City, Utah aired MyNetworkTV programming from midnight to 2:00am (Mountain Time), and branded by its call letters rather than the network's standardized branding conventions (under which it would have branded as My 14); the reasons included a local marketing agreement with then-CBS owned-and-operated station KUTV, which allowed KJZZ to rebroadcast some syndicated programs from KUTV. The service had originally aired from 11:00pm to 1:00am. at the network's launch. St. George independent station KCSG replaced KJZZ as Utah's MyNetworkTV affiliate on August 18, 2008. KUSG, a former KUTV satellite, added MyNetworkTV to its schedule on September 20, 2010; however, it delays the service's programming by one hour (airing from 8:00 to 10:00pm) to accommodate a KUTV-produced 7:00pm newscast. In November 2010, KUSG completely replaced KCSG as Utah's MyNetworkTV affiliate and changed its call letters to KMYU, also adding a simulcast to KUTV's second subchannel to serve the main Salt Lake City market.
 KEVU-CD—Eugene, Oregon airs the MyNetworkTV schedule from 9:00 to 11:00pm Pacific Time, following a two-hour block of syndicated talk shows.
 KWKB—Iowa City, Iowa initially carried dual affiliations with both The CW and MyNetworkTV, and aired the latter's programming from 9:00 to 11:00pm (Central Time) weeknights, immediately following CW programming. On September 19, 2011, KWKB dropped its affiliation with the network (filling the timeslot with local programming), which temporarily left the market without a MyNetworkTV affiliate. In early October 2011, Cedar Rapids ABC affiliate KCRG-TV began carrying MyNetworkTV on its second digital subchannel; however, it delays the service's programming to 12:00 to 2:00am on Tuesday through Saturday mornings with locally produced and syndicated programs airing during the prime time hours.
 KDMI—Des Moines, Iowa, which rejoined MyNetworkTV on October 3, 2011, as a secondary affiliation and was affiliated with the service until September 2014, aired the service's programming weeknights from 11:00pm to 1:00am Central Time due to programming commitments to its This TV affiliation. Before dropping the network in September 2009, it had aired MyNetworkTV programming in a pattern. For nearly a year after KDMI initially dropped MyNetworkTV, CW affiliate KCWI-TV aired WWE SmackDown from the service on Saturdays from 7:00 to 9:00pm, but did not air the remainder of the service's programming.
 During its time as a dual CW-MyNetworkTV affiliate, KNVA—Austin, Texas aired MyNetworkTV programming Monday through Saturdays from 9:00 to 11:00pm, immediately following The CW's primetime lineup. In the month prior to the conversion of Llano-based sister station KBVO (which previously operated as a semi-satellite of NBC affiliate KXAN-TV) to a standalone MyNetworkTV affiliate, it aired the service's programming weeknights from 10:00pm to 12 midnight, following a KXAN-produced 9:00pm newscast which debuted on September 28, 2009 (coinciding with MyNetworkTV's transition to a syndication programming service) and a repeat of The Office.
 KRBK—Osage Beach, Missouri (serving the Springfield market) switched to a primary Fox affiliation on September 1, 2011, shifting MyNetworkTV programming to 9:00 to 11:00pm, immediately following Fox programming. During its time as an exclusive MyNetworkTV affiliate, it aired the service's schedule in a pattern.
 WLMT-DT2—Memphis, Tennessee, which affiliated with MyNetworkTV in October 2010, presented the service's Monday through Thursday lineups in pattern but aired its Friday lineup on Saturdays from 9:00 to 11:00pm until November 14, 2011, when the subchannel switched its primary affiliation from the Retro Television Network to Me-TV. Since then, WLMT-DT2 has presented all MyNetworkTV programming in pattern with content from Me-TV airing at all other times. In the year before its move to cable channel Syfy in October 2010, WWE SmackDown aired on WLMT's main channel on Saturdays from 7:00 to 9:00 p.m., although the remainder of MyNetworkTV's lineup was not carried. WLMT temporarily dropped MyNetworkTV programming in June 2013 while transitioning to a new owner and new studio facility.
 WNTZ-TV—Alexandria, Louisiana-Natchez, Mississippi and WEVV-DT2—Evansville, Indiana, both secondary MyNetworkTV affiliates, air MyNetworkTV programming weeknights from 11:00 p.m. to 1:00 a.m. (Central Time). Prior to July 1, 2011, when WEVV-DT2 replaced WTVW as Evansville's Fox affiliate, WEVV-DT2 aired MyNetworkTV programming at its recommended timeslot; from that point onward until July 2015 (when it moved the service's programming to its current timeslot in preparation for the August 3 relaunch of parent CBS affiliate WEVV-TV's news department and the concurrent debut of an hour-long primetime newscast for WEVV-DT2 that follows Fox programming), the subchannel aired the service's schedule weeknights from 9:00 to 11:00 p.m., immediately following Fox programming. WNTZ moved the MyNetworkTV lineup to 11:00 p.m. to 1:00 a.m. on September 9, 2013, in order to air the short-lived revival of The Arsenio Hall Show at 10:00 p.m.
 WCIX—Springfield, Illinois aired MyNetworkTV programming on a one-hour delay weeknights from 8:00 to 10:00 p.m. (Central Time), in order to accommodate a weeknight 7:00 p.m. newscast produced by sister station WCIA. In September 2017, they moved the newscast to 9p.m. and MyNetworkTV programming now airs in pattern.
 WISE-DT2—Fort Wayne, Indiana aired MyNetworkTV programming from 10:30 p.m. (following a local newscast produced by its NBC-affiliated parent station) to 12:30 a.m. on a secondary basis from August 1, 2011, to March 1, 2013. Since WFFT-TV (whose Fox affiliation was assumed by WISE-DT2 in 2011) rejoined Fox on the latter date, WISE-DT2 has aired MyNetworkTV programming in pattern as an exclusive affiliate.
 WNAC-TV—Providence, Rhode Island, also a secondary affiliate, aired MyNetworkTV programming weeknights from 11:30 p.m. to 1:30 a.m., with Saturday primetime shows running on early Sunday mornings from 1:30 to 3:30 a.m. until 2009 (WNAC has since moved the MyNetworkTV affiliation to a digital subchannel, then later moved to a subchannel of WPRI-TV which presents the service's programming in pattern).
 WGGB-DT2—Springfield, Massachusetts, also a secondary affiliate, airs MyNetworkTV programming weeknights from 11:05 p.m. to 1:05 a.m.
 WLIO-DT2—Lima, Ohio, also a secondary affiliate, airs MyNetworkTV programming weeknights from 11:00 p.m. to 1:00 a.m.
 WTRF-DT2—Wheeling, West Virginia-Steubenville, Ohio aired MyNetworkTV programming weeknights from 11:00 p.m. to 1:00 a.m. until Fox-affiliated with a subchannel of NBC affiliate WTOV-TV in September 2014, when it began airing the service's schedule in pattern.
 WXTX—Columbus, Georgia aired MyNetworkTV programming from 12:05 to 2:05 a.m., until the station terminated its secondary affiliation with the service in 2012 (MyNetworkTV does not currently have an over-the-air affiliate in the Columbus market).
 WTHI-DT2—Terre Haute, Indiana – which became the first MyNetworkTV affiliate in that market on September 1, 2011, when it also assumed the Fox affiliation from WFXW (now ABC affiliate WAWV-TV) – airs MyNetworkTV programming as a secondary affiliation from 11:00 p.m. to 1:00 a.m.
 WKTC—Columbia, South Carolina previously scheduled MyNetworkTV programming in pattern until March 17, 2014, when it became a primary affiliate of The CW (the first dual affiliate of both networks since 2011); the station retains a secondary MyNetworkTV affiliation, airing its lineup after The CW's primetime schedule from 10:00 p.m. to 12:00 a.m.
 WUAB—Cleveland, Ohio introduced a 9:00-10:30 PM newscast by sister channel WOIO on September 21, 2015. This shifted MyNetworkTV programming to airing from 11 p.m. to 1 a.m. weeknights. After WUAB replaced WBNX as the market's CW affiliate in July 2018, the CW's network schedule has been carried in full pattern while MyNetworkTV programming was shifted again to 1-3 a.m. weeknights (the aforementioned 9 p.m. newscast reverted to its previous 10-11 p.m. timeslot). In January 2019, MyNetworkTV was moved to sister station WOIO's digital subchannel 19.2 - which predominantly carries MeTV - where MyNetworkTV airs from 1 to 3 a.m. late nights.
 KDFI—Dallas, Texas - Starting in August 2017, this affiliate has moved MyNetworkTV programming to the 8:00 p.m. to 10:00 p.m. (Central) timeslot in order to air two episodes of Family Feud at 7:00 p.m., and has changed its branding to "Fox 4 More". From launch until that time, KDFI aired MyNetworkTV's programming live at 7:00 p.m., and was branded "My 27".
 WFTC—Minneapolis, Minnesota - On December 31, 2016, WFTC moved My Network programming to 8:00-10:00 p.m. due to adding Syndicated programming. On September 18, 2017, My Network programming was moved to 9:00-11:00 p.m. due to WFTC, now being rebranded as "Fox 9+", introducing a 7:00 p.m. newscast and adding additional syndicated programming. On July 16, 2018, WFTC expanded their 7:00 p.m. news to 1 hour, combined with adding more syndicated programming, shifted My Network programming to 10:00 p.m. to 12:00 a.m.
 WVNS-DT2—Lewisburg/Bluefield/Beckley, West Virginia also a secondary affiliate, airs MyNetworkTV programming from 12:00 to 2:00 a.m. on Tuesday through Saturday mornings.
 KOLN-DT3/KGIN-DT3/KSNB-DT2—Lincoln-Grand Island, Nebraska airs MyNetworkTV programming from 12:00 to 2:00 a.m. on Tuesday through Saturday mornings.
 WMYT-TV—Rock Hill, South Carolina-Charlotte, North Carolina began airing MyNetworkTV programming from 11:00 p.m. to 1:00 a.m. in September 2018, using the time slot to air syndicated comedies.
 WRBW—Orlando, Florida began airing MyNetworkTV programming from 10:00 p.m. to midnight, effective August 12, 2019, using the 8:00 p.m. to 10:00 p.m. time slot to air an 8p.m. newscast, syndicated comedies, and a repeat showing of Dr. Phil.
WPHL-TV—Philadelphia, Pennsylvania began airing MyNetworkTV programming from 2 to 4a.m. on Tuesday through Saturday mornings as of the fall of 2019, using the 8 to 10p.m. time slot to air syndicated comedies.
 WCTX—New Haven-Hartford, Connecticut began airing an 8-11:35 p.m. newscast produced by sister station WTNH on March 16, 2020, pushing MyNetworkTV programming to late night; it now airs from 11:35 p.m. to 1:35 a.m.
 WATL—Atlanta, Georgia began airing newscasts produced by sister station WXIA-TV from 8 to 10 p.m. on December 2, 2019, pushing MyNetworkTV programming to late night; it now airs from midnight to 2a.m.
 WDCA—Washington, D.C. airs an 8:00 p.m. half-hour newscast produced by sister station WTTG, an episode of Family Feud, a 9:00 p.m. half-hour newscast also produced by WTTG and an episode of Extra from 8:00p.m. to 10:00 p.m. MyNetworkTV programming currently airs from 11:00 p.m. to 1:00 a.m.

Viewership

Original format

MyNetworkTV's debut was far from successful. Desire scored a 1.1 household rating/2 share; Fashion House went up to 1.3/2. Fox had sold about half of its projections of $50 million in advance commercial sales. On March 7, 2007, MyNetworkTV began to be included in Nielsen's daily "Television Index" reports, alongside the other major broadcast networks, although it was still not part of the "fast nationals" that incorporate the other networks. Last-minute changes to MyNetworkTV's 2007-08 fall schedule included the retitling of the reality series Divorce Wars to Decision House, and the addition of Celebrity Exposé and Control Room Presents to the network's Monday lineup as well as a one-hour IFL Battleground, followed by NFL Total Access on Saturdays.

The network's shift from telenovelas to reality shows and movies produced only a small bump in the ratings. It averaged only a .7 household rating during September 2007. MyNetworkTV continues to be the second lowest-rated English-language broadcast network in the United States, ahead of only Ion Television. The night MyNetworkTV debuted WWE SmackDown, the network took fifth place in household ratings ahead of The CW, but went back to sixth place shortly afterward. Of the six broadcast networks, Nielsen Media Research said that only MyNetworkTV had increased viewership, with 1.76 million viewers per night, up 750,000 from the previous season.

On January 5, 2009, MyNetworkTV aired episodes of the 2002 revival of The Twilight Zone (which originally aired on UPN, one of the networks MyNetworkTV had replaced). The series helped the network's ratings rise, along with WWE SmackDown, becoming the second highest-rated program on the network. The highest-rated program to have ever aired on MyNetworkTV is a December 10, 2008 broadcast of the 1990 comedy film Home Alone, which brought in 3.70 million viewers (although not a record), but earned a 1.4 rating among the 18-49 adult demographic.

Current format
On February 9, 2009, Fox Entertainment Group announced that MyNetworkTV would convert from a television network to a programming service, similar to that of Ion Television, with a focus on repeats of acquired programs originally aired on broadcast and cable networks and in first-run syndication. Litton Entertainment had reportedly expressed interest in leasing MyNetworkTV's Saturday evening time slots, which MyNetworkTV chose to instead turn back over to its affiliates. MyNetworkTV began airing more syndicated programming in the fall, which included game shows and dramas, five nights a week. This required the network's affiliates to re-negotiate a new affiliate agreement with the new corporation within Fox operating MyNetworkTV, Master Distribution Service, Inc., though it also gave a full and unencumbered "out" to stations which chose to end their association with MyNetworkTV under this guise, which Ion Television did with their three affiliates.

On April 12, 2010, WWE announced that WWE SmackDown would move to the Syfy cable channel that October; the move left MyNetworkTV with no first-run programming other than that it shared with its syndicators. Despite the lack of first-run programming, MyNetworkTV renewed its affiliation contracts for three more years on February 14, 2011. The programming service has seen significant viewership growth since its 2006 startup as a television network. Although ratings on MyNetworkTV do not match those of the other broadcast networks, Nexstar CEO Perry Sook noted his approval of its business model at the time, saying that Nexstar's MyNetworkTV stations get 'more (local ad) inventory per hour' than they would be associated with a traditional network such as Fox or ABC. Nexstar has since become the largest affiliate base for The CW through several acquisitions.

In announcing its fall schedule for the 2012-13 schedule, MyNetworkTV executives revealed that the programming service increased ratings over the previous year, and rated as the #6 most-watched network during the 2011–12 season with around 2.5 million viewers.

Affiliates

MyNetworkTV has 186 owned-and-operated or affiliate stations in the United States, reaching 84.39% of all U.S. households with at least one television set (totaling approximately 263,699,742 homes). This number includes six stations owned at the time of its launch by companies involved in the founding of competitor The CW: three were owned by Tribune Broadcasting (located in Atlanta, Philadelphia and Seattle), and three owned by CBS Corporation (the Gannett Company purchased Atlanta affiliate WATL from Tribune shortly after Fox confirmed it as a MyNetworkTV affiliate, with the sale being finalized on August 7, 2006). The Tribune Company sold its stake in The WB, in exchange for long-term affiliation contracts with The CW (Time Warner and CBS jointly own the network instead).

On March 6, 2006, the Sinclair Broadcast Group announced an agreement to affiliate 17 of its stations with MyNetworkTV (consisting mostly of stations that were set to lose their WB affiliations when The CW launched, as well as a few that were affiliated with UPN or operated as independent stations). This occurred despite the widespread presumption that affiliations with The CW, which at that point was in the process of signing affiliates in most markets, would be more valuable; however, Sinclair implied that MyNetworkTV was more financially attractive for the company (of the Sinclair stations that initially affiliated with MyNetworkTV, San Antonio affiliate KMYS has since disaffiliated from the service; its August 30, 2010 affiliation swap with Fredericksburg-based CW affiliate KCWX was the first and so far only known affiliation switch between same-market affiliates of the two outlets since their formation in 2006). One day later on March 7, Raycom Media announced that its WB and UPN stations (including WUAB/Cleveland, Ohio, KFVE/Honolulu, Hawaii and WBXH-CA/Baton Rouge, Louisiana) would also become charter affiliates of MyNetworkTV.

One of the stations named in a list of newly signed MyNetworkTV affiliates that Fox Entertainment Group released on April 26, 2006, was KNVA in Austin, Texas, which The CW had also added to its own list of confirmed affiliates one week prior. On May 1, 2006, another previously confirmed CW affiliate, KWKB in Iowa City, Iowa, signed on as a MyNetworkTV charter affiliate. Until October 2009, these two stations were the only ones to be aligned with both new networks (KNVA has since become an exclusive CW affiliate as parent station KXAN-TV converted its semi-satellite KBVO into a standalone MyNetworkTV affiliate); KNVA branded its MyNetworkTV lineup under the banner "MyNetworkTV on The CW Austin," while KWKB's website features station logos labeled as both "KWKB The CW" and "My KWKB". In May, WAWB in Huntsville, Alabama officially announced that it would become a MyNetworkTV affiliate, and subsequently changed its call letters to WAMY.

On July 12, 2006, the network announced affiliation agreements with seven additional stations (including WBFS-TV/Miami, KTVD/Denver, WUPL/New Orleans and WAWS/Jacksonville, Florida (WAWS, along with WSYX/Columbus, Ohio and WHP-TV/Harrisburg, Pennsylvania carry MyNetworkTV on digital subchannels). The deal with CBS Television Stations to have MyNetworkTV affiliate with stations that were left out of The CW's affiliation deals with the group came as a surprise in the broadcasting industry, especially after the icy reception between CBS and News Corporation (which became 21st Century Fox through the July 2013 spin-off of the company's publishing unit and Australian television properties) that began after both it and The CW came into the picture, as they refused to allow WBFS, WUPL and Boston's WSBK-TV to affiliate with MyNetworkTV as a response to pulling UPN branding from that network's Fox-owned stations.

In August 2006, MyNetworkTV filled in its remaining gaps within the top 100 television markets. On August 11, the network announced affiliations with WNAC-TV in Providence, Rhode Island (as a secondary affiliate) and WNGT-LP in Toledo, Ohio. Additionally, on August 22, MyNetworkTV added KAUT-TV in Oklahoma City, Oklahoma and WRGT-TV in Dayton, Ohio (the latter of which would carry the network on a digital subchannel) to the affiliate list on its website; also that month, WZMY in Derry, New Hampshire was announced as the network's Boston area affiliate (WBIN – the former WZMY – disaffiliated with MyNetworkTV in September 2011, at which time WSBK (which had shunned MyNetworkTV at its formation in 2006) took over the MyNetworkTV affiliation in Boston; KAUT became an independent station in September 2012, with MyNetworkTV moving to former independent KSBI).

From its inception as a network until July 2010, Mobile, Alabama was the largest city where MyNetworkTV did not have an affiliate, although Fort Walton Beach, Florida-based WFGX serves as the affiliate for the Mobile–Pensacola–Fort Walton Beach market. This was due to WFGX's weak analog signal, which was not receivable west of Pensacola, and the lack of a must-carry agreement with Comcast's Mobile system, most likely a remnant of the station's former status as a low-rated Jewelry Television affiliate prior to MyNetworkTV's launch); WFGX has since relocated its digital transmitter to Robertsdale, Alabama (where the Mobile-Pensacola market's other television stations maintain transmitters), providing an over-the-air MyNetworkTV affiliate in the Mobile area proper for the first time. On September 28, 2009, three stations owned by Ion Media Networks (WPXX-TV in Memphis, Tennessee and WEPX-TV, along with satellite station WPXU-TV, in the Greenville-New Bern-Washington, North Carolina market), due to an affiliation agreement made by their previous owners, dropped their MyNetworkTV affiliations to become full-time Ion Television owned-and-operated stations as they had been prior to September 2006 (the affiliation in the Greenville-New Bern market was taken over by NBC affiliate WITN-TV, which carries the network on a digital subchannel).

Memphis CW affiliate WLMT – which picked up MyNetworkTV for the sole purpose of carrying SmackDown, and due to the conversion into a programming service – elected to not carry the remainder of the network's schedule; eventually, after SmackDown moved to Syfy, WLMT began carrying the remainder of the MyNetworkTV lineup as a secondary affiliation (to the Retro Television Network) on its second digital subchannel.

Also in September 2009, Des Moines, Iowa affiliate KDMI disaffiliated from MyNetworkTV, replacing it with programming from the station's existing This TV affiliation. CW affiliate KCWI-TV picked up the local rights to SmackDown, and for nearly a year afterward, aired it in a manner very similar to its scheduling on WLMT. Until October 3, 2011, when KDMI rejoined the service, Des Moines was the largest television market without a MyNetworkTV affiliate – either over-the-air or on cable (CBS affiliate KCCI took over the MyNetworkTV affiliation from KDMI in December 2014, carrying it as a primary affiliation on its third digital subchannel). On September 19, 2011, Cedar Rapids, Iowa affiliate KWKB dropped the service, while retaining its existing CW affiliation; ABC affiliate KCRG-TV later picked up MyNetworkTV for its second digital subchannel.

On February 10, 2014, St. Louis affiliate WRBU disaffiliated from MyNetworkTV, and converted into an Ion Television O&O, as a result of its sale to Ion Media Networks through Roberts Broadcasting's gradual sale of its television stations in order to raise money to pay off creditors in its Chapter 11 bankruptcy proceedings; this resulted in St. Louis temporarily displacing Spokane, Washington as the largest market without a MyNetworkTV affiliate until November 17, 2014, when CBS affiliate KMOV began carrying it on a digital subchannel.

Due to the availability of "instant duopoly" digital subchannels that are likely easily available on cable and satellite, and the overall lack of a need to settle for a secondary affiliation with shows aired in problematic time slots, both The CW and MyNetworkTV launched with far greater national coverage than that enjoyed by UPN and The WB when those networks started in January 1995. For several years, UPN had affiliation gaps in several of the top 30 markets, and by 2005 managed to reach only 86% of the population. This resulted in that network having to settle for secondary affiliations with stations that were already affiliated with other networks. In those markets, programs (such as Star Trek: Voyager and Star Trek: Enterprise) were either shown out of their intended timeslots or not at all, leading to many viewer complaints. There are a handful of smaller markets, however, where MyNetworkTV holds a secondary affiliation – even on digital subchannels – because those markets are home to only a very small number of stations, and want to place more emphasis on programming from ABC, CBS, NBC and Fox – which may have previously lacked affiliations in those markets – on those subchannels.

Nevertheless, because MyNetworkTV was announced after the formation of The CW and therefore got most of the "leftover" stations shut out by The CW, there are still availability issues in some markets. Also, the network is mostly relegated to low-powered stations in some smaller markets, which do not have must-carry status. The arrival of WWE SmackDown to the network has made this issue the most visible, as wrestling fans complained about the lack of availability for MyNetworkTV in several markets that have CW affiliations. This was most evident in Lexington, Kentucky, where local SmackDown viewers actually protested that they could not watch the program because low-powered MyNetworkTV/Retro Television Network affiliate WBLU-LP lacked carriage on cable providers in the market, and as an Equity Media Holdings station with no local presence outside of engineering staff, had no communication with the station to speak of. That was solved shortly afterward when ABC affiliate WTVQ agreed to move its weather forecast service to digital subchannel 36.3 and convert the 36.2 subchannel into a MyNetworkTV affiliate, stripping WBLU of its affiliation in the process.

On September 19, 2022, WSBK-TV in Boston, Massachusetts and WBFS-TV in Miami, Florida both dropped MyNetworkTV and returned as full-time Independent stations, leaving Boston and Miami as the largest markets without a MyNetworkTV affiliate.

Branding
In the months leading up to MyNetworkTV's launch, several of its charter stations changed their on-air identities in preparation for joining the network, including all of the network's owned-and-operated stations under sister company Fox Television Stations. Affiliates also began to air network promotions featuring the theme, "Entertainment you can call your own." At first, many Fox-owned charter stations branded their soon-to-be MyNetworkTV O&Os with the "My" moniker (for example, WWOR-TV was branded as "My 9"). However, by the third week of October 2006, at least one station, Los Angeles O&O KCOP-TV, went to a two-column brand – verbally identifying as "MyNetworkTV Channel 13," and using a logo combining that used by the network (on the left side) and the station's channel number, 13 (on the right); KCOP switched to the simpler "My 13" branding in May 2007.

While "My [channel #]" is the conventional branding style for MyNetworkTV's stations, some stations use the network's logo style with different names, such as WSTR-TV (which formerly branded as "My 64", but revived its former brand "Star 64" in 2009). Especially after its shift in business model, some affiliates began to drop the "My" branding and logo in favor of local brands, such as KZJO (which re-branded from "myQ²", in reference to its sister station KCPQ "Q13 Fox", to "JoeTV", following similar moves by Tribune Media-owned The CW stations to adopt local brands), WTTA (which switched its branding from "My TV Tampa Bay" to "Great 38" in September 2013), WPMY (which switched from "My Pittsburgh TV" to "22 the Point" in August 2015 and even changed their call sign to WPNT to fit the new branding), former affiliate KAUT-TV (initially "OK43", but later "Freedom 43" as part of its efforts to appeal to Oklahoma's military community), and various Nexstar Media Group-owned affiliates (which use similar brands derived from their call letters and channel numbers, such as KARZ-TV "Z42").

In 2017, Fox began to re-brand some of its MyNetworkTV O&Os to closer associate them with their parent Fox stations, such as WDCA, which became "Fox 5 Plus". Meredith emulated this approach on KPDX and WNEM-DT2, which similarly re-branded as "Fox 12 Plus" and "WNEM-TV 5 Plus".  Fox's KCOP rebranded from "My 13" to "KCOP 13" after moving MyNetworkTV to an overnight schedule in 2021, but eventually adopted the "Fox 11 Plus" branding in 2023.

At the time plans for MyNetworkTV were announced, there was at least one station that was using a similar moniker. WZMY-TV in Derry, New Hampshire filed a trademark for the "MyTV" name on July 6, 2005, and for a short time there was speculation that the station would file a lawsuit against Fox for the use of "MyTV". The concerns were rendered moot in July 2006, when WZMY announced that it would be Boston's affiliate for the new network.

MyNetworkTV does not display an on-screen logo bug in the bottom right-hand corner of the screen, although its affiliates are inclined to display their own logo bug during the service's program lineup if they choose to incorporate it. However, on November 13, 2006, it began to incorporate a translucent logo of the program currently being aired on the bottom left side, but it discontinued this practice in March with the beginning of the third telenovela cycle.

See also
 2006 United States broadcast TV realignment
 The CW

References

External links

 
Television networks in the United States
Fox Corporation subsidiaries
Television channels and stations established in 2006
Television broadcasting companies of the United States